In Greco-Roman mythology, the Propoetides (Ancient Greek: Προποιτίδες) are the daughters of Propoetus from the city of Amathus on the island of Cyprus.

Mythology 
In Roman literature, they are treated by Ovid in his Metamorphoses (book 10.238 ff.):

Nevertheless, the immoral Propoetides dared to deny that Venus was the goddess. For this, because of her divine anger, they are said to have been the first to prostitute their bodies and their reputations in public, and, losing all sense of shame, they lost the power to blush, as the blood hardened in their cheeks, and only a small change turned them into hard flints.

The story of Venus and her vengeance on the Propoetides for failing to worship her properly is a common theme in a number of stories and poems written about the goddess.

According to Ovid, after seeing the Propoetides prostituting themselves, Pygmalion determined that he was "not interested in women". This drove him to create a woman of his own in statue form, with whom he then fell in love.

According to Herodotus, ancient tradition in Cyprus "compels every woman of the land to sit in the temple of Aphrodite and have intercourse with some stranger at least once in her life." Cyprus was famous for this forced sacred prostitution in the ancient world; this fame informed Ovid's tale of the Propoetides. (Historian Stephanie Budin contends that this type of prostitution was a myth, and did not actually occur in Cyprus.)

Notes

References 

 Publius Ovidius Naso, Metamorphoses translated by Brookes More (1859-1942). Boston, Cornhill Publishing Co. 1922. Online version at the Perseus Digital Library.
 Publius Ovidius Naso, Metamorphoses. Hugo Magnus. Gotha (Germany). Friedr. Andr. Perthes. 1892. Latin text available at the Perseus Digital Library.

Women in Greek mythology
Characters in Greek mythology
Greek female prostitutes
Metamorphoses characters
Metamorphoses into inanimate objects in Greek mythology
Cypriot mythology